The Solčava subdialect (solčavski govor) is a Slovene subdialect in the Styrian dialect group. It is a subdialect of the Upper Savinja dialect spoken around Solčava and the Logar Valley. It is the westernmost of the (sub)dialects in the Styrian dialect group.

Phonological and morphological characteristics
The Solčava subdialect is partially influenced by Carinthian dialects. The subdialect has the Upper Carniolan vowel system (except for the Upper Carniolan reflexes of long yers, here becoming e:/a:) and a slightly closer quality of e, becoming diphthongized to i:e. Secondarily accented e and o become e: and o:, as in Upper Carniolan. The reflex of short and secondarily accented ə is also the same as in Upper Carniolan.

References

Slovene dialects in Styria (Slovenia)